IPSCS or iPSCs may refer to

 Closed-circuit_television#IP_cameras
 Induced pluripotent stem cell